The Fugang Fishery Harbor is a harbor in Taitung City, Taitung County, Taiwan.

Geography
The harbor is located at Beinan Creek.

Economy
The harbor is the portal for sea fishing and acts as a tourist fish market.

Destinations
Through its jetties, it serves as the gateway access to Taiwan offshore islands:
 Green Island at Nanliao Harbor
 Orchid Island at Kaiyun Harbor

Transportation
The harbor is accessible by shuttle service, bus, or taxi from Taitung Station.

See also
 Taitung City

References

Ports and harbors of Taitung County